The 2022–23 season is the 100th season in the history of Villarreal CF and their 10th consecutive season in the top flight. The club are participating in La Liga, the Copa del Rey, and the UEFA Europa Conference League.

Players

First-team squad

Reserve team

Out on loan

Transfers

In

Out

Pre-season and friendlies

Competitions

Overall record

La Liga

League table

Results summary

Results by round

Matches 
The league fixtures were announced on 23 June 2022.

Copa del Rey

UEFA Europa Conference League

Play-off round 

The draw for the play-off round was made on 2 August 2022.

Group stage 

The draw for the group stage was held on 26 August 2022.

Knockout phase

Round of 16 
The draw for the round of 16 was held on 24 February 2023.

Statistics

Squad statistics 
Last updated 3 January 2023.

|-
! colspan=14 style=background:#dcdcdc; text-align:center|Goalkeepers

|-
! colspan=14 style=background:#dcdcdc; text-align:center|Defenders

|-
! colspan=14 style=background:#dcdcdc; text-align:center|Midfielders

|-
! colspan=14 style=background:#dcdcdc; text-align:center|Forwards

|-
! colspan=14 style=background:#dcdcdc; text-align:center| Players transferred out during the season

|}

Notes

References 

Villarreal CF seasons
Villarreal
2022–23 UEFA Europa Conference League participants seasons